The Illinois State Redbirds football program is the intercollegiate American football team for Illinois State University located in the U.S. state of Illinois. The team competes in the NCAA Division I Football Championship Subdivision (FCS) and are members of the Missouri Valley Football Conference. The school's first football team was fielded in 1887. The team plays its home games at the 13,391 seat Hancock Stadium. They are coached by Brock Spack.

History
Prior to 1923, the Illinois State football team was known as the Teachers or Fighting Teachers. When Clifford E. Horton began coaching the team in 1923, he proposed the Cardinals as the team's new nickname, after its red and white colors. The Pantagraph sports editor Fred Young changed the name to the Redbirds to distinguish the team from the nearby St. Louis Cardinals.

Classifications
1906–1956: None
1956–1972: NCAA College Division (Small College)
1973–1975: NCAA Division II
1976–1977: NCAA Division I
1978–1981: NCAA Division I–A
1982–2006: NCAA Division I–AA
2006–present: NCAA Division I FCS

Conference memberships
1887–1907: Independent
1908–1949: Illinois Intercollegiate Athletic Conference
1950–1969: Interstate Intercollegiate Athletic Conference
1970–1972: Independent
1973–1975: Division II Independent
1976–1977: Division I Independent
1978–1980: Division I–A Independent
1981–1985: Missouri Valley Conference
1986–present: Gateway Football Conference/Missouri Valley Football Conference

Conference championships

Illinois State has won 10 conference titles, four outright.

† Co-championship

Postseason appearances
Illinois State has made eight appearances in the Division I–AA/FCS playoffs, garnering a record of 10–8.

Bowl games
Illinois State has one bowl appearance, going 0-1.

Wins Over FBS Teams

Head coaches

Rivalries

Eastern Illinois

The Mid-America Classic is the rivalry game between Illinois State and Eastern Illinois. The rivalry began in 1901 and is the oldest in the state of Illinois. With the 100th game in the series, representatives from both schools met and developed the Mid-America Classic renaming for the rivalry. The two schools also collaborated on a traveling trophy, which holds plaques with the results of the previous 100 games in the series and has room for results of future games in the series. The two teams have played 108 times in total, with Illinois State holding a 57–42–9 advantage in the all-time series as of the end of the 2019 season.

National Award Winners

Mosi Tatupu Award
Ryan Hoffman, 2005

The Mosi Tatupu Award was given annually to the College Football Special Teams Player of the Year by the Maui Quarterback Club and the Hula Bowl, from 1997 to 2006.

Notable former players
Notable alumni include:

 B. J. Bello
 Duane Butler
 Aveion Cason
 Luke Drone
 Kevin Glenn
 Boomer Grigsby
 Jim Fitzpatrick
 Larry Fitzpatrick
 Davontae Harris
 Shelby Harris
 Brent Hawkins
 Estus Hood
 Jason Johnson
 Andy King
 John Kropke
 Cameron Meredith
 Jim Meyer
 Tom Nelson
 James O'Shaughnessy
 Nate Palmer
 Mike Prior
 Tre Roberson
 James Robinson
 Laurent Robinson
 Joe Vodicka
 Cody White
 Mike Zimmer
 Colton Underwood
 Michael Liedtke

Redbirds drafted into the NFL

References

External links
 

 
American football teams established in 1887
1887 establishments in Illinois